The Athletics at the 2016 Summer Paralympics – Women's 400 metres T12 event at the 2016 Paralympic Games took place on 17 September 2016, at the Estádio Olímpico João Havelange.

Heats

Heat 1 
11:03 15 September 2016:

Heat 2 
11:09 15 September 2016:

Heat 3 
11:15 15 September 2016:

Final 
18:25 17 September 2016:

Notes

Athletics at the 2016 Summer Paralympics